Archibald Montgomerie may refer to:
 Archibald Montgomerie, 11th Earl of Eglinton (1726–1796), Scottish general, and Member of Parliament (MP)
 Archibald Montgomerie, 13th Earl of Eglinton (1812–1861), British Conservative politician
 Archibald Montgomerie, 14th Earl of Eglinton (1841–1892), Scottish noble and member of the House of Lords
 Archibald Montgomerie, 16th Earl of Eglinton (1880–1945)
 Archibald Montgomerie, 17th Earl of Eglinton (1914–1966)
 Archibald Montgomerie, 18th Earl of Eglinton (1939–2018)